By-polls for 8 constituencies of the Gujarat Legislative Assembly were carried out in November 2020. The bypolls were necessitated after sitting Congress MLAs resigned. Five of them then joined the ruling BJP, which fielded them from the same seats they had won in the 2017 elections. As many as 81 candidates contested the bypolls across the eight seats.

Results by constituency

References 

By-elections in India
State Assembly elections in Gujarat
2020 State Assembly elections in India